Christa Faust (born June 21, 1969, in New York City) is an American author who writes original novels, as well as novelizations and media tie-ins. Faust won the 2009 Crimespree Award (Best Original Paperback) for Money Shot.  Money Shot also received nominations for Best Paperback Original from the Edgar Awards, Anthony Awards, and Barry Awards.

Bibliography

Novels
Control Freak (1998)
Hoodtown (2004)
Triads (2004) (with Poppy Z. Brite)
Money Shot (2008)
Hunt Beyond the Frozen Fire (2010)
Choke Hold (2011)
Butch Fatale, Dyke Dick: Double-D Double Cross (2012)

Novelizations and media tie-ins
A Nightmare on Elm Street: Dreamspawn (2005)
The Twilight Zone: Burned / One Night at Mercy (2005)
Final Destination 3 (2006)
Friday the 13th: The Jason Strain (2006)
Snakes on a Plane (2006)
Supernatural: Coyote's Kiss (2011)
Fringe: The Zodiac Paradox (2013)
Fringe: The Burning Man (2013)
Fringe: Sins of the Father (2013)
Batman: The Killing Joke (2018)

References

External links
Official homepage
 

American women writers
Living people
1969 births
Writers from New York City
American horror writers
American crime writers
Women crime writers
21st-century American women